Harrison's Guest House, at 1001 F St. in Las Vegas, Nevada, also known as Harrison House, was listed on the National Register of Historic Places in 2016.  

Harrison operated it as a boarding house from 1942 to her death in 1957, then it was operated by her sister until 1960. It is notable for having served African-American entertainers in Las Vegas, as well as other African-Americans.

References

National Register of Historic Places in Nevada
Buildings and structures completed in 1942
Clark County, Nevada